Taxable estate may refer to:

 the estate taxable under estate taxes
 taxable real-estate under property taxes
 a type of estate in the Social estates in the Russian Empire